Thomas K. Hudson is an American academic administrator serving as the 12th president of Jackson State University since November 2020.

Life 
Thomas K. Hudson was raised in Jackson, Mississippi. He graduated from Provine High School in 1995. Hudson earned a bachelor's degree from Jackson State University in 1999. He earned a J.D. from the University of Mississippi School of Law. Hudson worked in practiced law and later worked as an equal employment opportunity specialist at the Federal Emergency Management Agency. 

In 2012, he joined the staff at Jackson State University, working in various roles including as the chief operating officer, chief diversity officer, and its Title IX coordinator. Hudson served as acting president before being named its 12th president on November 19, 2020, succeeding William B. Bynum. In January 2023, Hudson received a vote of no-confidence from the university faculty senate.

Hudson is married to Phylandria. They have two daughters.

References 

Living people
Year of birth missing (living people)
Place of birth missing (living people)
Lawyers from Jackson, Mississippi
Jackson State University alumni
Jackson State University faculty
University of Mississippi School of Law alumni
21st-century African-American academics
21st-century American academics
21st-century American lawyers
African-American lawyers
African-American academic administrators
Heads of universities and colleges in the United States